Oliver Nunatak is one of the Rambo Nunataks, lying 2 nautical miles (3.7 km) south of Sowle Nunatak on the west side of Foundation Ice Stream, in the Pensacola Mountains. Mapped by United States Geological Survey (USGS) from surveys and U.S. Navy air photos, 1956–66. Named by Advisory Committee on Antarctic Names (US-ACAN) for Thomas H. Oliver, electronics technician at Plateau Station, winter 1967.

Nunataks of Queen Elizabeth Land